Minar E Pakistan (literally "Tower of Pakistan") is a tower located in Lahore, Pakistan. The tower was built between 1960 and 1968 on the site where the All-India Muslim League passed the Lahore Resolution (which was later called the Pakistan Resolution) on 23 March 1940 - the first official call for a separate and independent homeland for the Muslims of British India, as espoused by the two-nation theory. The resolution eventually helped lead to the creation of Pakistan in 1947.

The tower is located in the middle of an urban park, called the Greater Iqbal Park.

Design

The tower reflects a blend of Mughal/Islamic and modern architecture.

The tower was designed and supervised by, Nasreddin Murat-Khan, a Russian-born Pakistani architect and civil engineer. The minaret provides a panoramic view to visitors who can access the top by climbing up the stairs or by means of an elevator.

The tower base is shaped like a flower. The area surrounding the monument is covered with parks and flowers. The location is often used for political and religious events. It is also known as the "Liberty Tower of Pakistan".

Structure 

The base is about 8 metres above the ground. The tower rises about 62 metres on the base, and the total height of the Minar is about 70 metres above the ground. The unfolding petals of the flower-like base are 9 metres high. The diameter of the tower is about 9.75 meters. The rostrum is built of patterned tiles, and faces Badshahi Mosque. The base consists of four platforms. To symbolise the humble beginning of the struggle for freedom, the first platform is built with uncut stones from Taxila, the second platform is made of hammer-dressed stones, and the third platform is made of chiselled stones. Polished white marble used for the fourth and final platform depicts the success of the Pakistan Movement. The structure uses the imagery of crescents and stars, signs that symbolize the culture of Pakistan, similarly seen in the National Flag.

Mr. Mukhtar Masood, a prolific writer and the then–deputy commissioner of Lahore, was one of the members of the Building Committee for the tower. Services Engineer Mian Abdul Ghani Mughal went on to build many other landmarks of Pakistan, including Gaddafi Stadium Lahore, City Hospital Gujranwala, Chand da Qila By-Pass Gujranwala, Lords Hotel, and University of Punjab Campus Gujranwala.

Inscriptions 
At the base, there are floral inscriptions on ten converging white marble commemorative plaques. The inscriptions include the text of the Lahore Resolution in Urdu, Bengali and English, as well as the Delhi Resolution's text, which was passed on 9 April 1946. On different plaques, Quranic verses and 99 names of Allah are inscribed in Arabic calligraphy. Other important inscriptions included on the monument are the National Anthem of Pakistan in Urdu and Bengali, excerpts from the speeches of Muhammad Ali Jinnah in Urdu, Bengali and English; and a few couplets written by Allama Iqbal.

Construction
The foundation stone was laid on 23 March 1960. Construction took eight years, and was completed on 21 October 1968 at an estimated cost of Rs 7,058,000. The money was collected by imposing an additional tax on cinema and horse racing tickets at the demand of Akhter Husain, governor of West Pakistan.

Significance
Minar-e-Pakistan is considered the national emblem of Pakistan, and an expression of post-colonial national identity.

Notable visits and events
On February 21, 1999, Indian PM Atal Bihari Vajpayee became the first Indian leader to visit Minar-e-Pakistan (previous Indian state visits to Pakistan had not included a visit to Lahore). Vajpayee's visit was compared to Nixon's visit to China in terms of significance.

Minar-e-Pakistan has served as the location for a number of rallies. The rallies have often caused damage to the surrounding flora, according to the Parks and Horticulture Authority. In 2014, the Punjab government considered banning any political or non-political large gatherings.

Gallery

See also 
 List of parks and gardens in Pakistan
 List of parks and gardens in Lahore
 List of parks and gardens in Karachi

Bibliography 

 State of Human Rights in Pakistan. Pakistan, Human Rights Commission of Pakistan, 2004.

References

External links

 https://web.archive.org/web/20070311052425/http://archnet.org/library/sites/one-site.tcl?site_id=364
 https://web.archive.org/web/20070109183759/http://www.lahore.com/content/section/4/45/

Architecture of Lahore
Buildings and structures in Lahore
Islamic architecture
Monuments and memorials in Pakistan
National symbols of Pakistan
Architecture in Pakistan
Towers in Lahore
Tourist attractions in Lahore
Walled City of Lahore
Nasreddin Murat-Khan buildings and structures
Minarets in Pakistan